Ennaalum Sarath..? is a 2018 Indian Malayalam-language suspense drama film written and directed by Balachandra Menon and starring himself along with debutants Charlie Joe, Nitya Naresh, and Parvathy Arun. The film was released on 27 July 2018.

Cast 
 Balachandra Menon as Dr. Sam
 Charlie Joe as Sarath
 Parvathy Arun as Elizabeth (Liz) 
 Nitya Naresh as Micky
 Akhil Vinayak as  Navas Sherif
 Mallika Sukumaran as Dr. Sams mother
 Viji Thampi as Principal
 Lal Jose as Peter
 Major Ravi as John (S.P)
 Jude Anthany Joseph as Sreekanth (I.P.S)
 A. K. Sajan as Fr.Joy
 Joy Mathew as Violin Teacher
 Dileesh Pothan as Doctor
 Sidharth Siva as Salam Parapanangady (Director)
 Joshy Mathew as Fr. Thottathil
 Mareena Michael Kurisingal as Malavika Sreekanth
 Surabhi Lakshmi as Abhishtta Lekshmi (DYSP)
 Ponnamma Babu as Sarath's Mother
 Kunchan (actor) as Sarath's father
 Kottayam Nazeer as Policeman
 Noby as Dharman
 Joby as Shop Assistant
 Poojapura Radhakrishnan as Politician
 Karyavatom Sasikumar as an MLA
 Mary as a Shop Helper
 Deepika Mohan as Hostel Matron
 Reena as Mother Superior
 Lakshmi Priya as Lady Police officer
 Devi Ajith as Navas Sherif's mother
 Meenakshi Mahesh as heroines young age
 Anoop Krishnan as Sub Inspector Ravi
 Leona Lishoy as Haseeba - in Photograph stills

Production
The film features 40 newcomers in lead and supporting roles. Apart from actors, nine film directors portrays other characters—Lal Jose, Major Ravi, Sidhartha Siva, Viji Thampi, Jude Anthany Joseph, A. K. Sajan, Joy Mathew, Joshy Mathew, and Dileesh Pothan. Menon introduced his son Akhil Vinayak in a cameo role in the film.

Soundtrack
The soundtrack consists two songs composed by Ouseppachan. The first music video of the song "Sasiyane" was released by Nivin Pauly on his Facebook page. The video was released on the YouTube channel of the label Muzik 247 on 22 June 2018.

Release
Ennaalum Sarath..? released in Kerala on 27 July 2018.

References

External links
 

2010s Malayalam-language films
Indian thriller drama films
Films scored by Ouseppachan
Films directed by Balachandra Menon